Melani Bergés Gámez (born 6 May 1990) is a blind Spanish Paralympic athlete who competes in sprinting events in international level events.

References

1990 births
Living people
People from Badalona
Sportspeople from the Province of Barcelona
Paralympic athletes of Spain
Spanish female sprinters
Athletes (track and field) at the 2016 Summer Paralympics
Athletes (track and field) at the 2020 Summer Paralympics
Visually impaired sprinters
Paralympic sprinters
Medalists at the World Para Athletics Championships
Medalists at the World Para Athletics European Championships